Joshua S. Goldstein (born December 27, 1952) is professor emeritus of international relations at American University. He graduated with a BA from Stanford University in 1981 and earned his doctorate at MIT 1986. He was appointed professor in 1993. He was on the faculty at the University of Southern California and American University and was a research scholar in political science at University of Massachusetts, Amherst.

In 1993, he founded the Bosnia Support Committee, which he chaired for two years.

Selected publications
 This book exams the causes of the Kondratiev Wave, identifying production, prices, war, innovation, investment and real wages as factors. Goldstein returned to this subject in 2005 in a paper, "Predictive power of long wave theory, 1989-2004".

References

External links
 Official website

1952 births
American political scientists
Living people